Covington Historic District is a national historic district located at Covington, Virginia. The district encompasses 108 contributing buildings, 1 contributing site, and 1 contributing structure in the historic core of the city of Covington. It includes late-19th and early-20th-century commercial buildings, dwellings that date from around 1820 until 1940, and governmental, educational, religious, industrial, and transportation-related
buildings. Notable buildings include Merry Stand (c. 1817), the James Burk House (1824), Callaghan House (1840s), William W. Lawrence House (1850s), Rinehart Building (c. 1895), Covington Savings Bank (1910s), I. O. O. F. Building, Covington Post Office (1914), Hotel Collins (1910), Hippodrome Theater (1920s), C&O Railway and Freight Station (1914-1915), Alleghany County Courthouse (1910), Alleghany
County Jail, Sacred Heart Catholic Church, Emmanuel Episcopal Church, First Presbyterian Church (1924), and Covington Baptist Church (1902).

It was listed on the National Register of Historic Places in 1991.

References

Historic districts on the National Register of Historic Places in Virginia
Federal architecture in Virginia
Victorian architecture in Virginia
Buildings and structures in Covington, Virginia
National Register of Historic Places in Covington, Virginia